is a railway station on the Chitose Line in Eniwa, Hokkaido, Japan, operated by Hokkaido Railway Company (JR Hokkaido).

Lines
Megumino Station is served by the Chitose Line.

Station layout
The station has two side platforms serving two tracks.

Platforms

History
The station opened on 1 March 1982. With the privatization of Japanese National Railways (JNR) on 1 April 1987, the station came under the control of JR Hokkaido.

See also
 List of railway stations in Japan

External links

 JR Hokkaido station map 

Railway stations in Hokkaido Prefecture
Eniwa, Hokkaido
Railway stations in Japan opened in 1982